

Outdoor sculptures

 A Parade of Animals (1991), Oregon State Capitol
 Afghan–Iraqi Freedom Memorial (2006)
 Breyman Fountain (1904), Wilson Park, Oregon State Capitol
 Capitol Beaver Family (1985), Oregon State Capitol
 The Circuit Rider (1924), Oregon State Capitol
 Covered Wagon (1934), Oregon State Capitol
 Daughters of Union Veterans Civil War Memorial (1933), City View Cemetery
 Eco-Earth Globe (2003), Riverfront Park
 Grasshopper (1988)
 Hatfield Fountain (1989), Willamette University
 Statue of Jason Lee, Oregon State Capitol
 Korean War Memorial
 Lewis and Clark (1934), Oregon State Capitol
 Lady Justice, Truman Wesley Collins Legal Center
 Liberty Bell (1950), Oregon State Capitol
 Statue of John McLoughlin, Oregon State Capitol
 Medal of Honor Monument
 Oregon Pioneer, Oregon State Capitol
 Oregon Veterans Medal of Honor Memorial (2003), Oregon State Capitol
 Oregon World War II Memorial (2014), Oregon State Capitol
 Over the Top to Victory (1924)
 Sprague Fountain (1980), Oregon State Capitol
 To Scale the Scales of Justice (2010), Justice Building
 Tom McCall Memorial (2008), Riverfront Park
 Town and Gown (1991)
 Veterans of Foreign Wars Monument
 Waite Fountain (1912), Oregon State Capitol
 World War I Memorial (1954), Marion County Courthouse

Culture of Salem, Oregon
Salem
 
Salem, Oregon